Wahlenbergia capensis, commonly known as the Cape bluebell, is a plant in the family Campanulaceae and is native to the Cape Province but has been introduced to Australia. It is an annual herb with up to four greenish blue, bell-shaped flowers with spreading petal lobes.

Description
The lower leaves are egg-shaped to elliptic but become lance-shaped higher up. Each plant has up to four bluish-green long stalked flowers that are dark blue near the centre and often have black spots. The style is dark blue with five branches on its tip. Flowering occurs from September to December.

Taxonomy and naming
Cape bluebell was first formally described in 1753 by Carl Linnaeus who gave it the name Campanula capensis and published the description in Species Plantarum. In 1830, Alphonse Pyramus de Candolle changed the name to Wahlenbergia capensis. The specific epithet (capensis) refers to the native distribution of the species, the ending -ensis being a Latin suffix "denoting place, locality or country".

Distribution and habitat
Wahlenbergia capensis is widespread in, and restricted to the Western Cape between Clanwilliam and Knysna in South Africa. It is found on the lower sandstone slopes and the sandy flats of this region. Due to its annual life cycle it is also able to persist successfully on disturbed land, such as along roadsides and on cultivated land. It is an introduced species occurring in the south-west of Western Australia where it is found between Kalbarri and Tambellup. The species was first collected in Western Australia in 1898.

Ecology 
The flowers are pollinated by monkey beetles. Large numbers of seeds are produced in capsules. There are two main methods of dispersal. The first of these is through the strong summer winds of the region. The seeds are shaken out through the apical valves of the capsule. Alternately, the capsule may attach to the fur of animals by its coarse, stiff hairs, facilitating the dispersal of the seed-filled capsules.

Conservation 
While it has not formally been assessed by the IUCN, this species is common and widespread. The South African National Biodiversity Institute (SANBI) does not consider this species to be threatened.

References

capensis
Flora of Australia
Flora of South Africa
Plants described in 1753
Taxa named by Carl Linnaeus